Nandini Balial is an American writer.

Early life
Balial was raised in India until the age of 9 when her family emigrated to the United States, where she was educated and works as a writer.

Career
During the COVID-19 pandemic, she followed in her mother's footsteps as a full-time teacher in the Fort Worth Independent School District and was among educators participating in conversations about the possible need for virtual learning for students.

Balial writes as a television and film critic (for Awards Daily TV, and for rogerebert.com). As a freelance writer (for The New Republic, Vice, Slate, Wired, The Texas Observer, Lit Hub, The Week'''', Harper's Bazaar, The Daily Beast, The AV Club, The Los Angeles Review of Books, Men's Journal, Pacific Standard, and Slate) she writes social commentary. Bilial's review of "the famous journalism film All the President's Men" is noted by Roy Peter Clark in his writer's how-to book, Murder Your Darlings''. In autobiography, highlighting her experiences as an Asian American student, educator, and US citizen, Balial has written help for educators and commentary on education (in middle school and in high school), life outside of India, and American citizenship.

References

American writers
1990 births
Living people
Indian emigrants to the United States